Group Sonangol is a parastatal that formerly oversaw petroleum and natural gas production in Angola. The group consisted of Sonangol E.P. and its many subsidiaries. The subsidiaries generally had Sonangol E.P. as a primary client, along with other corporate, commercial, and individual clients.

In February 2019, the government transferred the industry regulation functions of Sonangol to a new government agency, the National Oil, Gas and Biofuel Agency (ANPG). The ANPG also gained from Sonangol the right to award fossil fuel exploration, development, and production contracts.

History
On the eve of Portuguese Angola's independence from Portugal following the Carnation Revolution and the election of a democratic government in Portugal in 1976, the company ANGOL (ANGOL Sociedade de Lubrificantes e Combustíveis Sarl), founded in 1953 as a subsidiary of Portuguese company SACOR) was nationalized and split in two, forming Sonangol U.E.E. and Direcção Nacional de Petróleos.  Directive 52/76 instituted Sonangol as a state-owned company with a mandate to manage the country's substantial petroleum and natural gas. Using the extant remains of Texaco, Total, Shell and Mobil's oil works, Sonangol obtained the assistance of Algerian Sonatrach and of Italian Eni.

Oil giant Marathon Oil announced in September 2013 that it had agreed a deal in principle to sell a 10% stake in its offshore Angolan oilfield to Sonangol.

In December 2013, Sonangol acquired the exploration rights to five onshore oil blocks in Angola, which could be tendered for development at a later date.

In June 2016, president José Eduardo dos Santos removed the entire board of Sonangol, and installed Isabel dos Santos as chairwoman of the company, to "ensure transparency and apply global corporate-governance standards". This led to many accusations of corruption and nepotism. However, in November 15, 2017, the new president of Angola João Manuel Gonçalves Lourenço dismissed Isabel dos Santos and named Carlos Saturnino Guerra Sousa e Oliveira as the Sonangol chairman. An internal audit later revealed that after she had been dismissed, dos Santos transferred US$38 million of the company's funds to a suspicious Dubai based company.

In February 2019, a new government agency, the National Oil, Gas and Biofuel Agency (ANPG) took over regulation and promotion of the Angolan petroleum industry from Sonangol. ANPG was given the power to supervise Sonangol, and became the new National Concessionaire. In this regard, ANPG now controls who wins licenses to explore for petroleum, and awards contracts for production.

Sonangol sold in Puma Energy, an energy trading firm, to Trafigura in April 2021 for $600 million. Sonagol also purchased Puma's assets in Angola for $600 million. The assets included the Puamngol chain of gasoline stations, and several airport and marine terminals.

In 2021, the company's revenues had increased by 38%, placing turnovers at US$8.5bn for the year compared to the US$6.1bn from the previous year. Sonangol employs 13,000 employees.

Missing oil billions 
In December 2011, Human Rights Watch said that the Government of Angola should explain the whereabouts of US$32 billion missing from government funds linked to Sonangol. A December 2011 report by the International Monetary Fund (IMF) said that the government funds were spent or transferred from 2007 through 2010 without being properly documented in the budget. The IMF was assured that most of $32 billion was being used for legitimate government reasons and considered to be "found".

Organization
Today (as of 2006), Sonangol has over 30 subsidiaries and maintains overseas facilities in the following cities:
 Brazzaville, Congo
 Hong Kong
 Houston, US
Sonangol USA Co. (SonUSA) has its head office in the Energy Corridor area in Houston.
 London, UK
 Sonangol Limited has its head office in the Merevale House in Kensington, RBKC, London.
 Singapore.

As the company grew it had a need to obtain services, such as telecommunications services, retail network support, trucking, shipping, data management, scientific, engineering, seismic, and others. The company created subsidiaries to meet these needs. Sonangol and its many subsidiaries have continued to expand into other lines of business. Among the more important subsidiaries are Sonair and MSTelcom.

Sonangol is one of the major shareholders of the Portuguese energy company Galp Energia through its indirect participation in the capital of Amorim Energia, which holds one third of GALP's shares and on which board sits the son-in-law of the Angolan President.

Sonangol is an important sponsor of the arts, sports and humanities in Angola and in Africa. On December 12, Reuters reported that Sonangol won the rights to develop the Iraq's Najmah oilfield in a bid held that day. Sonangol had proposed a per-barrel fee of $8.50, but then accepted the Oil Ministry's lower amount.

In 2018, Sonangol announced that they will reactivate their Iraqi oil exploration fields in Najma and Qayara after years of closure due to constant armed conflicts. The two oil fields in Iraq are estimated to still have a reserve of 1 billion barrels of oil.

Subsidiaries
 ESSA (Angola) Training
 Kwanda Logistical Support logistical support, Kwanda field
 MSTelcom telecommunications
 Sodimo real estate management
 SonAir oil and gas industry air transport service
 Sonangol P&P Oil exploration
 Sonagas Natural Gas Exploration
 Sonadiets  corporate infrastructure
 Sonamer  oil recovery; deep drilling
 Sonamet  petroleum platform manufacturing; metal structure fabrication
 Sonangol Distribuidora downstream petroleum products including gasoline/petrol
 Sonangol Shipping maritime crude oil transport
 Sonangol USA, located in Houston, Texas
 Sonaship maritime petroleum product transport
 Sonasurf offshore oil work logistics
 Sonatide offshore oil work logistics
 Sonawest seismic data service
 Sonils Logistical Support logistical support http://www.sonils.co.ao/
 Sonangol Starfish Brasil P&P Oil exploration
 "Petromar’s" shares are divided 70% (Saipem) 30% (Sonangol) https://www.petromar.co.ao/about/

Technologies
Sonangol USA, Sonangol London, and Sonangol Asia are the main trading and operations offices for the crude and product cargoes sold on behalf of Sonangol E.P. Sonangol Starfish which is located in Brasil, Rio de Janeiro since 22 of March 2010

References

Further reading

External links

 Sonangol
 Sonangol USA
 Sonangol London, in English and Portuguese
 Sonangol Polska

Oil and gas companies of Angola
Ang
Government of Angola
Companies based in Luanda
Energy companies established in 1976
Non-renewable resource companies established in 1976
1976 establishments in Angola
Angolan brands
Galp Energia